John Hugh Carroll (20 March 1934 – 30 March 1998) was an Australian Rugby Union player who represented the Wallabies eight times.

Early life
Carroll was born in Sydney and attended Newington College (1946–1949). He played in the juniors at Mosman before joining the Norths in the second row.

Representative career
At the age of twenty four Carroll played in his first test match in New Zealand against the New Zealand Māori rugby union team. He retired from representative rugby due to a knee injury.

Business life
Carroll operated a copra plantation in Papua New Guinea during the 1960s and 1970s.

References

1934 births
1998 deaths
People educated at Newington College
Australian rugby union players
Australia international rugby union players
Rugby union players from Sydney
Rugby union locks